Datu Pax Ali Mangudadatu (born ) is a Filipino politician who is the governor of Sultan Kudarat.

Background
Datu Pax Ali Mangudadatu is a son of Suharto "Teng" Mangudadatu and Mariam Sangki. He came from the Mangudadatu clan, a political family with both his parents involved in politics. His grandather is Pax Mangudadatu who was likewise a politician.

Governor of Sultan Kudarat
Pax Ali Mangudadatu ran for the position of governor of Sultan Kudarat in the 2022 elections as a candidate under Lakas–CMD. His only rival was Sharifah Akeel Mangudadatu as his only rival. His political rival filed a bid to cancel his candidacy by disputing his status as a resident of Lutayan town of the province. The Commission on Election cancelled Pax Ali's candidacy on January 18, 2023. However, Pax Ali on May 6, 2023 was able to secure a temporary restraining order for the cancellation of his candidacy allowing him to stand for election. Pax Ali won the election with 262,854 votes with his rival only garnering 86,868 votes.

References

Living people
Governors of Sultan Kudarat
People from Sultan Kudarat
Year of birth missing (living people)